Break beat may refer to:
Breakbeat, a musical genre
Break (music)#Breakbeat (element of music)